I've Got Dreams to Remember may refer to:

 "I've Got Dreams to Remember", a 2006 episode of One Tree Hill
 "I've Got Dreams to Remember", a 1968 song by Otis Redding